Derbforgaill, Dearbhfhorgaill or Dearbhfhorghaill may refer to:

 Derbforgaill (1st century BC), wife of Lugaid Riab nDerg
 Der Forgaill, died 684.
 Derbfhorgaill, Princess of Leinster, died 1080.
 Derbforgaill ingen Teige, Queen of Ireland, died 1098.
 Derbforgaill Ní Lochlainn, Queen of Connacht, died 1151.
 Derbforgaill Ní Flainn, died 1176.
 Derbforgaill, Princess of Midhe, 1108-1193.
 Derbforgaill Ní Dubhda, Princess of Uí Fiachrach Muaidhe, died 1265.
 Dervorguilla of Galloway, c. 1210-1290
 Derbforgaill Ní Flionn Esa, died 1296.
 Derbforgaill Ní Conchobair, died 1314.
 Derbforgaill Ní Chonchobair, died 1351.
 Derbforgaill Ní Fherghail, died 1355.
 Derbforgaill Ní Conchobair Ruaid, died 1385.
 Derbforgaill Ní Conchobair Duinn, died 1476.
 Derval O'Rourke, Irish athlete, born 1981.

See also
List of Irish-language given names

External links
 http://medievalscotland.org/kmo/AnnalsIndex/Feminine/DerBforgaill.shtml

Irish-language feminine given names